Malpighia proctorii is a species of plant in the family Malpighiaceae. It is endemic to Jamaica.  It is threatened by habitat loss.

References

proctorii
Critically endangered plants
Endemic flora of Jamaica
Taxonomy articles created by Polbot